Elden Francis Curtiss (born June 16, 1932) is an American prelate of the Roman Catholic Church. He served as bishop of the Diocese of Helena in Montana from 1976 to 1993, and as archbishop of the Archdiocese of Omaha in Nebraska from 1993 to 2009.

Biography

Early life
Elden Curtiss was born on June 16, 1932, in Baker City, Oregon, the eldest of four sons of Elden and Mary (née Neiger) Curtiss.  He studied at St. Edward Seminary in Kenmore, Washington.

Curtiss was ordained to the priesthood for the Diocese of Baker by Bishop Francis P. Leipzig on May 24, 1958. After his ordination, Curtiss  assigned to parishes in Lakeview, La Grande, and Jordan Valley, Oregon, and served as a hospital chaplain.
 
Curtiss furthered his studies at Fordham University in New York City, at the University of Portland in Portland, Oregon, and at the University of Notre Dame in Notre Dame, Indiana, acquiring a Master of Divinity degree and a master of arts degree in education administration.  Curtiss served as director of information and as superintendent of schools in the Diocese of Baker.  In 1970, he joined the faculty of Mount Angel Seminary in Saint Benedict, Oregon; in 1972, he was appointed president-rector of the seminary.

Bishop of Helena
On March 4, 1976, Curtiss was appointed as the seventh bishop of the Diocese of Helena by Pope Paul VI.  He was consecrated on April 28, 1976, by Archbishop Cornelius Power. Curtiss selected as his episcopal motto: "That We May All Be One".

Archbishop of Omaha
Curtiss was named the fourth archbishop of the Archdiocese of Omaha by Pope John Paul II on May 4, 1993. Succeeding the retiring Archbishop Daniel Sheehan, Curtiss was installed on June 25, 1993.

During his tenure as the Bishop of Helena, Curtiss chose to reassign a priest who had been accused of pedophilia in 1959, later admitting that he had not properly examined the church's personnel file on the individual concerned. Curtiss faced similar criticism in 2001 in regard to a priest accused of accessing child pornography. Curtiss, it was alleged, had failed to bring the case to the attention of the authorities, and had chosen to send the priest for counseling and to reassign the priest, removing him from his high-school teaching position but reassigning him to a middle-school.

Retirement and legacy 
Upon reaching his 75th birthday in 2007, Curtiss submitted his resignation, as required by church law.  In 2009, Pope Benedict XVI accepted his resignation and named Bishop George J. Lucas as his successor.

In 2009, Curtiss stated that the bishops had "learned the hard way", but that the church was better now that it had gone through the process of responding to the sexual abuse issues.

See also
 

 Catholic Church hierarchy
 Catholic Church in the United States
 Historical list of the Catholic bishops of the United States
 List of Catholic bishops of the United States
 Lists of patriarchs, archbishops, and bishops

References

External links
Roman Catholic Archdiocese of Omaha Official Site

Episcopal succession

20th-century Roman Catholic archbishops in the United States
21st-century Roman Catholic archbishops in the United States
Roman Catholic archbishops of Omaha
1932 births
Living people
Roman Catholic bishops of Helena
People from Baker City, Oregon
Roman Catholic Diocese of Baker
Fordham University alumni
University of Portland alumni
University of Notre Dame alumni
Mount Angel Seminary
Catholics from Oregon